Callicercops is a genus of moths in the family Gracillariidae.

Species
Callicercops iridocrossa (Meyrick, 1938) 
Callicercops milloti (Viette, 1951) 
Callicercops triceros (Meyrick, 1926)

External links
Global Taxonomic Database of Gracillariidae (Lepidoptera)

Gracillariinae
Gracillarioidea genera